{|
{{Infobox ship image
|Ship image=Suffren-IMG 8647.jpg
|Ship caption=1/20th scale model of Suffren, lead ship of Saint Louiss class, on display at the Musée national de la Marine
}}

|}

The Saint Louis''' was a 90-gun Suffren-class Ship of the line of the French Navy. She was the twenty-second ship in French service named in honour of Louis IX of France.

 Career 
Started as Achille, the ship was renamed Saint Louis in 1850. She took part in the Crimean War as a troopship, In July 1854, she ran aground at Kiel, Prussia. She was refloated on 26 July. She bombed the Tétouan forts on 20 November 1859, and served in the French intervention in Mexico in 1862.

She was renamed Cacique'' in 1881 and served as a gunnery school, and was eventually broken up in 1895.

Notes, citations, and references

Notes

Citations

References

 90-guns ships-of-the-line

Ships of the line of the French Navy
Ships built in France
1854 ships
Crimean War naval ships of France
Suffren-class ships of the line
Maritime incidents in July 1854